Jeremy Gardiner (born 26 April 1957) is a contemporary landscape painter who has been based in the United Kingdom and the United States. His work has been featured in books. It has also been reviewed in The Boston Globe, Miami Herald, The New York Times, and British newspapers including The Guardian and The Observer.

Early life and education
Jeremy Gardiner was born in Münster, Germany. He was educated at Newcastle University, UK (BA Hons in Fine Art, 1975–79) and the Royal College of Art in London (MA in Painting, 1980–83), where he was awarded a John Minton Scholarship.

Work themes

Gardiner seeks to capture the genius loci or a sense of place, with his artworks having been compared with those of Paul Nash and Graham Sutherland. His paintings are the product of a long engagement with coastal landscapes in Britain. He has continued the approach to landscapes of 20th-century St Ives modernist artists such as Peter Lanyon, Ben Nicholson, and John Tunnard. Gardiner's landscape subjects have included locations from the Jurassic Coast, especially in Dorset, and the coastline of Cornwall, in southern England.

Jeremy Gardiner's work Purbeck Light Years used hybrid techniques combining computer animation, painting and drawing, and immersive virtual reality. Gardiner also worked on a project Light Years Coast, a virtual recreation of the Jurassic Coast in Dorset.

Fellowships, grants, and awards
During 1984-86, Gardiner was a US Harkness Fellow in the MIT Media Lab at the Massachusetts Institute of Technology in the United States. Also in 1984, he was awarded a UK Churchill Fellowship.

Gardiner was the winner of the 2003 Peterborough Art prize for the work Purbeck Light Years. In 2013, he was awarded The Discerning Eye ING Art Prize for the work Pendeen Lighthouse Cornwall.

In 2017, Gardiner was awarded a Senior Fellowship by the UK Higher Education Academy, in 2020 he was awarded an Arts Council England Grant, and in 2022 he was awarded a British Council UK-China Connections through Culture Grant.

Exhibitions
Gardiner's work has been exhibited widely, including: A Panoramic View at the Pallant House Gallery in Chichester; Exploring the Elemental at The Nine British Art, St James's, London; Shorelines at St Barbe Museum, Lymington; Drawn to the Coast at the Paisnel Gallery, London; and South by Southwest at The Nine British Art, London.

In 2021, Gardiner's work was included in the Chengdu Tianfu Art Museum as part of the Chengdu Biennale, China.

Selected solo exhibitions
2013: Unfolding Landscape, Kings Place Gallery, London, UK
2013: Jeremy Gardiner, ING, City of London, UK
2015: Jurassic Coast, Victoria Art Gallery, Bath, UK
2016: Pillars of Light, The Nine British Art, London, UK
2018: Geology of Landscape, Candida Stevens Gallery, Chichester, UK
2019: Tintagel to Lulworth Cove, The Nine British Art, London, UK
2020: South by Southwest, St Barbe Museum and Art Gallery, Lymington, UK
2022: Contraband, Candida Stevens Gallery, Chichester, UK

Selected group exhibitions
1986: 42nd Venice Biennale, Venice, Italy
2010: Earthscapes, Geology and Geography, Thelma Hulbert Gallery, Honiton, Devon, UK
2015–16: Facing History, Victoria & Albert Museum, London, UK
2021–22: Superfusion, Chengdu Biennale, Chengdu, China

Works in collections
Jeremy Gardiner’s paintings are held in international collections in the United Kingdom including Hatton Gallery, Pallant House Gallery, Southampton City Art Gallery, Victoria Art Gallery, and elsewhere. Other collections with his work include BNP Paribas, London; Davis Polk & Wardwell, Paris; Ente Nazionale Idrocarburi (Eni), Milan; Government Art Collection, London; Imperial College Art Collection, London; ING Group, Amsterdam; NYNEX Corporate Collection, USA; Pinsent Masons; Royal College of Art Collection, London; Victoria and Albert Museum (V&A), London.

Academic positions
In parallel with being an artist, Jeremy Gardiner has held academic positions at Birkbeck, University of London, the University of West London, Bath Spa University, the University of Florida, Printmaking at the Royal College of Art, Department of Digital Arts at the Pratt Institute (New York), the Media Lab at the Massachusetts Institute of Technology, and a full professor position at Ravensbourne University London in east London.

References

Further reading

External links

1957 births
Living people
People from Münster
Alumni of Newcastle University
Alumni of the Royal College of Art
20th-century English painters
20th-century English male artists
English male painters
21st-century English painters
21st-century English male artists
English landscape painters
British digital artists
Academics of Birkbeck, University of London
Academics of the University of West London
Academics of Bath Spa University
University of Florida faculty
Academics of the Royal College of Art
Pratt Institute faculty
MIT School of Architecture and Planning faculty
Academics of Ravensbourne University London